Tony Thomas is a former professional rugby league footballer who played in the 1950s, 1960s and 1970s.

Playing career
Tony Thomas made his début for Wakefield Trinity during October 1959, and he played his last match for Wakefield Trinity during the 1966–67 season.

Challenge Cup Final appearances
Tony Thomas played left-, i.e. number 4, in Castleford’s 11-6 victory over Salford in the 1969 Challenge Cup Final during the 1968–69 season at Wembley Stadium, London on Saturday 17 May 1969, in front of a crowd of 97,939, and played right-, i.e. number 3, in the 7-2 victory over Wigan in the 1970 Challenge Cup Final during the 1969–70 season at Wembley Stadium, London on Saturday 9 May 1970, in front of a crowd of 95,255.

County Cup Final appearances
Tony Thomas played right-, i.e. number 3, in Wakefield Trinity's 18-2 victory over Leeds in the 1964 Yorkshire County Cup Final during the 1964–65 season at Fartown Ground, Huddersfield on Saturday 31 October 1964, and played left-, i.e. number 4, in Castleford's 11-22 defeat by Leeds in the 1968 Yorkshire County Cup Final during the 1968–69 season at Belle Vue, Wakefield on Saturday 19 October 1968.

BBC2 Floodlit Trophy Final appearances
Tony Thomas played right-, i.e. number 3, in Castleford's 8-5 victory over Leigh in the 1967 BBC2 Floodlit Trophy Final during the 1967–68 season at Headingley Rugby Stadium, Leeds on Saturday 16 January 1968.

References

External links
Search for "Thomas" at rugbyleagueproject.org
Tony Thomas Memory Box Search at archive.castigersheritage.com

Living people
Castleford Tigers players
English rugby league players
Place of birth missing (living people)
Rugby league centres
Wakefield Trinity players
Year of birth missing (living people)